Prior to the primary highway system which exists in the U.S. state of Iowa today, signed highway routes known as auto trails were registered with the Iowa State Highway Commission.  Organizations, such as the Lincoln Highway Association, volunteered to sponsor and register certain roads with the highway commission.  Each organization chose their colors and designed route markers to guide motorists along the way.  Eventually, confusion reigned and the highway commission took action.  Beginning in 1920, primary road numbers were assigned to registered routes.  Some of these registered routes, most notably the Lincoln Highway, are still famous today, while most have been long forgotten.

List of auto trails

References

Transportation in Iowa
Auto trails